This is a list of Italian films first released in 2013 (see 2013 in film).

See also
2013 in Italy
2013 in Italian television

External links
Italian films of 2013 at the Internet Movie Database

2013
Films
Italian